Malta air crash may refer to:
 1945 Avro York crash, 1945 air accident
 1946 Rabat Vickers Wellington crash, 1946 air accident
 1975 Żabbar Avro Vulcan crash, 1975 air accident
Żurrieq Scottish Airlines crash, 1956 air accident

See also
 1990 Faucett Perú Boeing 727 disappearance, 1990 airplane disappearance